Middle of the Moment is a soundtrack by English guitarist, composer and improvisor Fred Frith, of the 1995 documentary film, Middle of the Moment by Nicolas Humbert and Werner Penzel.

The film was made over a period of three years in the early 1990s, following the tuareg in North Africa and an avant garde circus troupe, Cirque O in Europe. The music comprises Frith compositions and sound collages drawn from field recordings of ambient sounds, conversations and indigenous music.

Frith describes how he created the soundtrack:

Track listing

Personnel
Fred Frith – guitar, bass, violin, keyboards, percussion
Fabrizio Appelius – accordion
Mikaela Dietl – accordion
Tim Hodgkinson – clarinet, bass clarinet, alto saxophone
Robert Lax – voice
Sandra M'Bow  – voice

Tuareg
Idaman walat Akhmudan – voice
Tshanak ag Abalbal – voice
women from the Kel Iforas tribe –  vocals, drumming

Cirque O
Josefina Lehmann – violin
Johann le Guillerm – accordion, voice
Bertrand Duva – Tibetan rattles
Attila Zombori – drums, percussion, guimbarde

Production
Peter Hardt – engineer

Re-issues
In 2004 Fred Records issued a remastered version of the soundtrack.

References

External links
artfilm.ch. Middle of the Moment

Albums produced by Fred Frith
Fred Frith soundtracks
1995 soundtrack albums
Fred Records soundtracks
RecRec Music soundtracks
Documentary film soundtracks